Ralph Williamson may refer to:

Ralph Williamson, captain of the St. Michael of Scarborough
Ralph Williamson (golfer), see Indiana Open
Ralph Williamson, in 1731 High Sheriff of Staffordshire